Remontnensky District is an administrative and municipal district (raion), one of the forty-three in Rostov Oblast, Russia. Its administrative center is the rural locality (a selo) of Remontnoye. Population: 19,152 (2010 Census);  The population of Remontnoye accounts for 37.6% of the district's total population.

Geography
The district is located in the southeast of the oblast. The Yergeni hills rise to the east.

References

Notes

Sources

Districts of Rostov Oblast